Lachen is a town in Mangan District in the Indian state of  Sikkim. The name Lachen means "big pass". The Sikkimese government promotes it as a tourist destination. The town forms the base to the Chopta Valley and Gurudongmar Lake.  An annual yak race, the Thangu is held there in summer.

Unlike other places in India, Lachen has a unique form of self-governance, Dzumsa. Every household is a member of this traditional administrative system, which is in charge of governing and organizing village activities.

Tourism 
The Lachen monastery and the women's handicraft centre to view weaving of traditional blankets and carpets reveal the local way of life. Gurudongmar lake at 17,800 ft elevation is encircled by snowy massifs.Thangu offers accommodations 30 km from Lachen. During summer and monsoon it is dotted with flowers.

The relatively unexplored and untouched Chopta Valley is located north of Lachen. Rich with alpine vegetation and  rhododendrons, lakes and rivers add to the valley's beauty. Chopta is known for its historical and religious monuments. Wildlife enthusiasts can spot rare species. Bird watching is popular and the region is suitable for trekking and other adventure sports.

Geography 
Just about 129 km from Gangtok, Lachen is located at an altitude of 8838 ft. Seasons unfold timelessly in this high altitude habitat: gaily painted with myriad flowers in the spring and monsoon, bathed in spectacular weather in autumn and snow clad fairy-tale winters.

Transport 

A short two-day-long trekking route also connects the Yumthang Valley to Lachen. It has a population of around 1,000. Lachen has its own system of rules and regulations known as Dzumsa. The heads of the Dzumsa are known as Pipon and Gyenbos.

To the north there is the old town of Thangu where the daytime temperature varies from 4 to 12 degrees Celsius (40 to 55 °F), even in the months of June and July.

Gurudongmar Lake can be reached from Lachen, a sacred lake in the Great Himalayas Region.

Lachen is connected with numerous routes in India. The most convenient ways to travel Lachen are by Air, Rail and Road.

Banking Facilities in Lachen  

As per RBI records only Axis bank presently has a branch in Lachen:

Axis Bank, Lachen

References

Cities and towns in Mangan district
Entry & Permit Formalities in Lachen,Sikkim